Jalo Autonen (4 May 1883 – 15 June 1959) was a Finnish sports shooter. He competed at the 1912 Summer Olympics and the 1924 Summer Olympics.

References

External links
 

1883 births
1959 deaths
Finnish male sport shooters
Olympic shooters of Finland
Shooters at the 1912 Summer Olympics
Shooters at the 1924 Summer Olympics
People from Mikkeli
Sportspeople from South Savo
20th-century Finnish people